Barnsdall High School is a secondary school in Barnsdall, Oklahoma. It belongs to the Barnsdall Independent School District.

Curriculum
Barnsdall High School offers a comprehensive secondary curriculum. As of January 2010, the school began following a four-day school week. Barnsdall was the second district in Osage County to adopt the shortened week as a money-saving measure.

Extracurricular activities

The school's athletic teams, known as the Barnsdall Panthers, compete in Oklahoma Secondary School Activities Association size classification A or 1A. Teams are fielded in basketball, football, softball, and wrestling. Athletic director Joe Gilbert has been a coach at the school for over 50 years.

State championship titles held by the school include:
Baseball: 1980
Slow Pitch Softball: 2013

Notable alumni
Thomas F. Hall, Assistant Secretary of Defense for Reserve Affairs

References

External links

Public high schools in Oklahoma
Schools in Osage County, Oklahoma
Public middle schools in Oklahoma